Marlene Sjöberg (born 15 January 1981) is a Swedish football former defender who last played for Göteborg FC of the Damallsvenskan. She also played for Jitex BK and Umeå IK. Sjöberg also played in the Champions League with Umeå and Göteborg.

She was a member of the Swedish national team, and made her debut in a 3–2 defeat to the United States in July 2006.

References

External links
 
 Profile  at SvFF
 
 
 Sjöberg retires

1981 births
Living people
Swedish women's footballers
BK Häcken FF players
Damallsvenskan players
Jitex BK players
Sweden women's international footballers
Umeå IK players
Women's association football defenders